The L.D. Reagin House is a historic house in Sarasota, Florida. It is located at 1213 North Palm Avenue. On October 25, 1984, it was added to the U.S. National Register of Historic Places. It was built by prominent local architect, Thomas Reed Martin.

References

External links
 Sarasota County listings at National Register of Historic Places
 Sarasota County listings at Florida's Office of Cultural and Historical Programs

Houses on the National Register of Historic Places in Sarasota County, Florida
Houses in Sarasota, Florida
Mediterranean Revival architecture in Florida
Houses completed in 1926
1926 establishments in Florida